Lyprocorrhe is a genus of beetles belonging to the family Staphylinidae.

The species of this genus are found in Europe.

Species:
 Lyprocorrhe anceps (Erichson, 1837)

References

Staphylinidae
Staphylinidae genera